O.H. Ivie Lake is a reservoir on the Colorado and Concho Rivers in Concho, Coleman, and Runnels counties, 55 miles east of San Angelo, Texas in the United States. The reservoir was formed in 1990 by the construction of S. W. Freese Dam at the Concho-Coleman county line by Brown and Root. The lake and dam are owned and operated by the Colorado River Municipal Water District.

References

Reservoirs in Texas
1990 establishments in Texas
Bodies of water of Concho County, Texas
Bodies of water of Coleman County, Texas
Bodies of water of Runnels County, Texas